Giraylar is a village in the Ergani District of Diyarbakır Province in Turkey.

References

Villages in Ergani District